The year 1759 in science and technology involved several significant events.

Astronomy
 Halley's comet returns; a team of three mathematicians, Alexis Clairaut, Jérome Lalande and Nicole Reine Lepaute, had—for the first time—predicted the date.

Biology
 Caspar Friedrich Wolff's dissertation at the University of Halle Theoria Generationis supports the theory of epigenesis.

Botany
 Kew Gardens established in England by Augusta of Saxe-Coburg, the mother of George III.

Geology
 Giovanni Arduino proposes dividing the geological history of Earth into four periods: Primitive, Secondary, Tertiary and Volcanic, or Quaternary.

Physics
 Posthumous publication of Émilie du Châtelet's French translation and commentary on Newton's Principia, Principes mathématiques de la philosophie naturelle.

Medicine
 Angélique du Coudray publishes Abrégé de l'art des accouchements ("The Art of Obstetrics").

Technology
 English clockmaker John Harrison produces his "No. 1 sea watch" ("H4"), the first successful marine chronometer.

Transport
 James Brindley is engaged by the Duke of Bridgewater to construct a canal to transport coal to Manchester from the duke's mines at Worsley, in North West England.
 October 16 – Smeaton's Tower, John Smeaton's Eddystone Lighthouse off the coast of South West England, is first illuminated.

Awards
 Copley Medal: John Smeaton

Births
 July 19 – Jacques Anselme Dorthès, French physician, entomologist and naturalist (died 1794)
 December 2 – James Edward Smith, English botanist (died 1828)
 Date unknown – Maria Pettracini, Italian anatomist and physician (died 1791)

Deaths
 February 16 – Bartholomew Mosse, Irish surgeon (born 1712)
 September 10 – Ferdinand Konščak, Croatian explorer (born 1703)

References

 
18th century in science
1750s in science